The 2018 Honda Indy Toronto was an IndyCar Series event held on July 15, 2018 in Toronto, Ontario, Canada. The race served as the 12th round of the 2018 IndyCar Series season. Reigning champion Josef Newgarden qualified on pole position, while current leader Scott Dixon took victory in the 85-lap race.

Results

Qualifying

Race 

Notes:
 Points include 1 point for leading at least 1 lap during a race, an additional 2 points for leading the most race laps, and 1 point for Pole Position.

Championship standings after the race 

Drivers' Championship standings

Manufacturer standings

 Note: Only the top five positions are included.

References 

Honda Indy Toronto
Honda Indy Toronto
Honda Indy Toronto
2018
July 2018 sports events in Canada